Marello is an Italian surname. Notable people with the surname include:

Alex Marello (born 1988), Canadian soccer player
José Luis Marello (born 1965), Argentine sprint canoeist
Joseph Marello (1844–1895), Italian Roman Catholic bishop
Maria Marello (born 1961), Italian discus thrower

Italian-language surnames